William Nunez Heysham (19 July 1828 – 12 December 1905) was an English first-class cricketer and barrister.

Heysham was born at Marylebone in July 1828, son of William Henry Heysham. He studied law at Trinity College, Oxford. He was a student at the Inner Temple, from where he was called to the bar in June 1853. He made a single appearance in first-class cricket in 1855 for the Surrey Club against the Marylebone Cricket Club at Lord's. He batted in both Surrey Club innings', being dismissed for 9 by Jemmy Dean in their first-innings, while in their second-innings he was dismissed by the same bowler for 13. He died at Paddington in December 1905.

References

External links
 

1828 births
1905 deaths
People from Marylebone
Alumni of Trinity College, Oxford
Members of the Inner Temple
English barristers
English cricketers
Surrey Club cricketers
19th-century English lawyers